Darrell Ray Colbert (born November 16, 1964) is a former American professional football player who was a wide receiver in the National Football League (NFL) and the World League of American Football (WLAF). He played for the Kansas City Chiefs of the NFL, and the San Antonio Riders of the WLAF. 

Colbert was born in Beaumont, Texas, and attended the black Hebert High School and then West Brook Senior High School after Hebert was merged into it. He played college football at Texas Southern University.

References

1964 births
Living people
American football wide receivers
Kansas City Chiefs players
People from Beaumont, Texas
Players of American football from Texas
San Antonio Riders players